Christopher Eubanks was the defending champion but lost in the quarterfinals to Wu Yibing.

Wu won the title after Jason Kubler retired in the middle of the third set with the score 6–7(5–7), 6–4, 3–1 in favor of Wu.

Seeds

Draw

Finals

Top half

Bottom half

References

External links
Main draw
Qualifying draw

Orlando Open - 1